William George Agar (7 October 1902 – 17 July 1966) was a rugby league footballer in Australia's leading competition - the New South Wales Rugby League (NSWRL).

Agar played 15 matches for the Eastern Suburbs club in the 1923–24 seasons. A Centre, Agar played in the 1923 premiership winning side. As a junior, Agar was also a member of the Eastern Suburbs side that won the presidents Cup in 1922 and is recognised as that club's 123rd player.

References

Australian rugby league players
Sydney Roosters players
1966 deaths
1902 births
Rugby league players from Sydney
Place of birth missing
Rugby league centres